A number of ships were named Anglo Saxon, Including:

, a Canadian ship which sank in 1863 with the loss of 237 lives
, a British ship which was torpedoed, shelled and sunk by the auxiliary cruiser  in 1940.

Ship names